Journal of Clinical Virology is a scientific journal that covers the aspects of human virology that directly pertains to virus-induced clinical conditions. The journal is published by Elsevier.

Abstracting and indexing 
The journal is abstracted and indexed in:

 Current Contents - Clinical Medicine
 Sociedad Iberoamericana de Informacion Cientifica (SIIC) Data Bases
 PubMed/Medline
 Embase
 Elsevier BIOBASE
 Scopus

According to the Journal Citation Reports, the journal has a 2021 impact factor of 14.481.

References

External links 

 

Elsevier academic journals
English-language journals
Virology journals
ISSN needed
Publications with year of establishment missing